The 2020–21 Taoyuan Pilots season was the first season of the franchise in the P. LEAGUE+ (PLG), first season overall, and its first in the Taoyuan City and playing home games at Taoyuan Arena. The Pilots were originally coached by Liu Yi-Hsiang, Liu resigned as head coach on December 22, 2020 due to personal matters. Yang I-Feng is currently acting as head coach temporarily.

Preseason 
On September 9, 2020, former Taiwanese professional basketball player Blackie Chen announcing the establishment of P. LEAGUE+ (PLG). The first game of PLG regular season was started on December 19, 2020.

Draft 
The P. LEAGUE+ (PLG) did not hold a draft in its first season.

Standings

Roster

Game log

Preseason

Regular season

Regular season note 
 Due to the COVID-19 pandemic, the Taoyuan City Government and Taoyuan Pilots declared that the games in Taoyuan Arena would be played behind closed doors from January 16, 2021 to February 7, 2021.

Playoffs

Playoffs note 
 Due to the COVID-19 pandemic, the league officials declared to change the location of Game 5 from Taoyuan Arena to Changhua County Stadium.
 The Pilots lost the Dreamers with 2-3 in the 2021 P. League+ Playoffs.

Player Statistics 
<noinclude>

Regular season

Playoffs

 Reference：

Transactions

From Taoyuan Pauian Archiland

Free Agency

Additions

Subtractions

Awards

End-of-Season Awards

Players of the Month

Players of the Week

References 

Taoyuan Pilots seasons
Tao